Smoljana may refer to:

 Boloria, a butterfly genus in the family Nymphalidae
 Smoljana, Bosanski Petrovac, a village near Bosanski Petrovac